Raimund Mössmer (7 April 1882 – 3 January 1944) was an Austrian footballer. He played in one match for the Austria national football team in 1902.

References

External links
 

1882 births
1944 deaths
Austrian footballers
Austria international footballers
Place of birth missing
Association footballers not categorized by position